
Gmina Wilków is a rural gmina (administrative district) in Opole Lubelskie County, Lublin Voivodeship, in eastern Poland.

Flood
In May and June 2010, in 2010 Central European floods, Wilków gmina were flooded in 90% of the all area, leaving only Rogów unflooded.

Villages
Gmina Wilków contains the villages and settlements of Brzozowa, Dobre, Kąty, Kępa Chotecka, Kłodnica, Kolonia Wrzelów, Kosiorów, Lubomirka, Machów, Majdany, Podgórz, Polanówka, Rogów, Rybaki, Szczekarków, Szczekarków-Kolonia, Szkuciska, Urządków, Wilków, Wilków-Kolonia, Wólka Polanowska, Zagłoba, Zarudki, Zastów Karczmiski, Zastów Polanowski and Żmijowiska.

Neighbouring gminas
Gmina Wilków is bordered by the gminas of Chotcza, Janowiec, Karczmiska, Kazimierz Dolny, Łaziska and Przyłęk.

References

 Polish official population figures 2006
 http://www.globalmapper.com.pl/flood_in_wilkowpl.html

Wilkow
Opole Lubelskie County